Americo Anthony "Ben" Bedini (December 16, 1921 – December 28, 2008) was an American football player and coach. He served as the first head football coach at Iona College in New Rochelle, New York from 1965 to 1969. His 1967 squad captured the club football national championship.

Head coaching record

College club

References

External links
 Iona Hall of Fame profile

1921 births
2008 deaths
Iona Gaels football coaches
Fordham Rams football coaches
Springfield Pride football players
High school football coaches in Connecticut
People from Ridgefield, Connecticut
Players of American football from Connecticut
High school football coaches in New York (state)